Luciano Ribeiro Corrêa (born 25 November 1982) is a Brazilian judoka, who competes in the -100 kg (half heavyweight) category.  He was world champion in the 2007 World Judo Championships.

As well as this, he has won a bronze at the World Judo Championships (2005), and has represented his country at the 2008 and 2012 Summer Olympics.

Achievements

References

External links
 
 
 Judo videos of Luciano Corrêa in action (judovision.org)

1982 births
Living people
Sportspeople from Brasília
Olympic judoka of Brazil
Judoka at the 2007 Pan American Games
Judoka at the 2008 Summer Olympics
Judoka at the 2011 Pan American Games
Judoka at the 2012 Summer Olympics
World judo champions
Brazilian male judoka
Pan American Games gold medalists for Brazil
Pan American Games bronze medalists for Brazil
Pan American Games medalists in judo
Judoka at the 2015 Pan American Games
Universiade medalists in judo
Universiade bronze medalists for Brazil
Medalists at the 2003 Summer Universiade
Medalists at the 2007 Pan American Games
Medalists at the 2015 Pan American Games
Medalists at the 2011 Pan American Games
21st-century Brazilian people